Vlad VI of Wallachia (c. 1508 – September 1532) was the voivode (prince) who ruled Wallachia between June 1530 and September 1532.  He has been historically referenced as Vlad Înecatul ("Vlad the Drowned"), as a description of the manner of his death.

One of three (along with Moldavia and Transylvania) primary historic and geographic regions of Romania, Wallachia was founded as a principality in the early 14th century by Basarab I but, by 1417, had accepted the suzerainty of the Ottoman Empire, albeit with considerable self-rule.  Descendants of the House of Basarab continued to rule Wallachia and, as recounted in surviving records from the time of Mihnea Turcitul (the young voivode in 1577–83 and 1585–91), the chronology of a century earlier indicates that the grandfather of Vlad VI, Vlad IV Călugărul [Vlad the Monk] was voivode from 1481 until his death in 1495.  His son Vlad cel Tânăr [Vlad V, the Younger] (ca. 1488–1512) became voivode in 1510, at the age of about 22 and, less than two years later, was captured following a defeat at the Battle of Bucharest and executed.

Although no specific historical documentation of his birth remains, the son of Vlad the Younger was about four years old at the time of his father's death.  He became voivode at about the same age as his father, 22, in the aftermath of his predecessor Moise's rebellion against the Ottomans, but was immediately contested by Moise himself and the Craiovești boyar family.  On 29 August 1530, at the Battle of Viișoara, Vlad VI defeated Moise who died in combat. In October, after a further unsuccessful rebellion of the Oltenian nobility led by Craiovești pretender to the throne Drăghici Gogoașă, who was subsequently executed in Constantinople, Vlad ended Craiovești's line of succession to the Banate of Craiova.

In his two years as voivode, Vlad is noted as having effected the construction of Dâmbovița County's famed Viforâta Monastery, in Aninoasa.  His life was cut short at about the same age as that of his father, 24, and the historical detail behind his posthumous cognomen is described in the contemporary text of Adolf Armbruster (Dacoromano-Saxonica, p. 198).  The account indicates that, following a prolonged banquet, at which, as customary, large quantities of alcoholic beverages were served, Vlad mounted his horse for a ride in the direction of Dâmbovița River in which, near the village of Popești, south of Bucharest, he drowned.  His burial at the Deal Monastery was arranged by his mother.

References

Giurescu, Constantin C. and Giurescu, Dinu C. (1976). Istoria Romanilor volume II (1352–1606) Pages 238–239. Editura Scintifica si Enciclopedica București (in Romanian).
McNally, Raymond T. and Florescu, Radu (1994). In Search of Dracula. New York: Houghton Mifflin .
Donat, Ion (1996). Domeniul domnesc în Ţara Românească (Sec. VIV - XVI), București (in Romanian).
Giurescu, Constantin C. (2000). Istoria Românilor, vol.II, București (in Romanian). 

 

Rulers of Wallachia
16th-century rulers in Europe
Romanian royalty
Deaths by drowning
Alcohol-related deaths in Romania
1508 births
1532 deaths
16th-century Romanian people
Place of birth unknown
Date of death unknown
Date of birth unknown
House of Drăculești
Burials at Dealu Monastery, Viforâta (Dâmboviţa County)